Joachim Neander (165031 May 1680) was a German Reformed (Calvinist) Church teacher, theologian and hymnwriter whose most famous hymn, Praise to the Lord, the Almighty, the King of Creation has been described by John Julian in his A Dictionary of Hymnology as "a magnificent hymn of praise to God, perhaps the finest creation of its author, and of the first rank in its class." Due to its popularity it has been translated several times into English—Catherine Winkworth being one of the translators in the 19th century—and the hymn has appeared in most major hymnals.

Neander wrote about 60 hymns and provided tunes for many of them. He is considered by many to be the first important German hymnist after the Reformation and is regarded as the outstanding hymnwriter of the German Reformed Church.

Life 
Joachim Neander was born in Bremen, the son of a Latin teacher. His grandfather, a musician, had changed the family name from the original German Neumann ('New man' in English) to the Graeco-Roman form Neander, following the fashion of the time. After the death of his father, he could not afford to study at a famous university. He therefore studied theology in his hometown from 1666 to 1670. At first, his heart was not in it. It was only when he heard a sermon of Theodor Undereyk (shortly before the end of his course) that his beliefs became serious.

In 1671 he became a private tutor in Heidelberg, and in 1674 he became a teacher in a Latin school in Düsseldorf, one step before becoming a minister. While living there, he liked to go to the nearby valley of the Düssel river, nature being the inspiration for his poems. He also held gatherings and services in the valley, at which he gave sermons. The Neandertal (originally Neanderthal, from German Thal for "valley," now spelled Tal, though both t and th represent a t-sound) was renamed in his honor in the early 19th century.

In 1679, Neander became a pastor of St Martin’s church in Bremen, as his popularity with the common people had caused problems with the church administration in Düsseldorf. One year later, at the age of 30, he died of tuberculosis.

Notable works

Being the first important hymn-writer of the German Reformed Church, Neander wrote his creations mostly at Düsseldorf.
The minister and elders of the Reformed Church had complete control of the school at Düsseldorf. About July 1673 to about May 1677 the minister was Sylvester Lürsen (a native of Bremen, and a few years older than Neander), a man of ability and earnestness, but jealous, and, in later times at least, quarrelsome.

Neander worked harmoniously alongside him at first, frequently preaching in the church and assisting in the visitation of the sick. But he soon introduced practices which inevitably brought on a conflict. He began to hold prayer meetings of his own, without informing or consulting the minister or elders; he began to absent himself from Holy Communion, on the grounds that he could not conscientiously commune along with the unconverted, and also persuaded others to follow this example; and became less regular in his attendance at the ordinary services of the Church.

Besides these causes of offence, he drew out a new timetable for the school, made alterations on the school buildings, held examinations and appointed holidays without consulting anyone.

The result of all this was a Visitation of the school on Nov. 29, 1676, and then his suspension from school and pulpit on Feb. 3, 1677. On Feb. 17 he signed a full and definite declaration by which "without mental reservations" he bound himself not to repeat any of the acts complained of; and thereupon was permitted to resume his duties as rector but not as assistant minister.

The suspension thus lasted only 14 days, and his salary was never actually stopped. The statements that he was banished from Düsseldorf, and that he lived for months in a cave in the Neanderthal near Mettmann are therefore without foundation. Still his having had to sign such a document was a humiliation which he must have felt keenly, and when, after Lürsen's departure, the second master of the Latin school was appointed permanent assistant pastor, this feeling would be renewed.

Creation of hymns

A number were circulated among his friends at Düsseldorf in MS., but they were first collected and published after his removal to Bremen, and appeared as:

 A und Ώ, Joachimi Neandri Glaub-und Liebesübung: — auffgemuntert durch ein fällige Bundes Lieder und Danck-Psalmen, Bremen, Hermann Brauer, 1680.
 Second edition, Bremen, 1683.
 Third edition, Bremen, 1687. The so-called third edition at Wesel, 1686, also found in Berlin, was evidently pirated. Other editions rapidly followed until we find the complete set (i.e., 57 or 58) formally incorporated as part of a hymnbook, e.g. in the Marburg Reformed Gesang-Buch, 1722, where the first part consists of Lobwasser's Psalter, the second of Neander's Bundeslieder, and the third of other hymns.  Neander's Bundeslieder also form a division of the Lemgo Reformed Gesang-Buch, 1722.
 Fourth edition, Frankfurt, 1689. These editions contain 57 hymns.
 Fifth edition, Frankfurt and Leipzig, 1691, edited by G. C. Strattner, eight hymns were added as being also by Neander.

The whole of these editions are in the Royal Library, Berlin. One of his favourites book used in the meetings conducted by G. Tersteegen, which in the fifth edition, Solingen, 1760, has the title Gott-geheiligtes Harfen-Spiel der Kinder Zion; bestehend in Joachimi Neandri sämtlichen Bundes-Liedern. In this way, especially in the district near Düsseldorf and on the Ruhr, Neander's name was honoured and beloved long after it had passed out of memory at Bremen.

Further reading 
 Helmut Ackermann: Joachim Neander. Sein Leben, seine Lieder, sein Tal. 3. erw. Aufl. Düsseldorf 2005, .
 Gerhard Dünnhaupt: "Joachim Neander (1650–1680)". In: Personalbibliographien zu den Drucken des Barock, Bd. 4. Hiersemann, Stuttgart 1991, pp. 2933–2936 (bibliography of his works and literature)
 Lore Esselbrügge: Joachim Neander, ein Kirchenliederdichter des 17. Jhs. Diss. Marburg 1921.
 Andreas L. Hofbauer: Meine Taube / in den Felßlöchern / in dem Verborgene der Steinritzen / laß mich hören deine Stimme. Ad Joachim Neander. In: Dirk Matejovski, Dietmar Kamper, Gerd-C. Weniger (eds.), Mythos Neanderthal, Frankfurt/New York 2001, .
 W. Nelle: Joachim Neander, der Dichter der "Bundeslieder" und "Dankpsalmen". Hamburg 1904.
 Joachim Neander: Bundeslieder und Dankpsalmen von 1680 mit ausgesetztem Generalbaß von Oskar Gottlieb Blarr. (Schriftenreihe des Vereins für Rheinische rJoachim Neander: Bundes-Lieder und Dank-Psalmen. Facsimile reprint of the first edition, Bremen 1680, with studies by Thomas Elsmann and Oskar Gottlieb Blarr. Bremen: Schünemann 2009, 192, 34 pp.

References

External links
 
 
 
 Hymnary entry for Joachim Neander

1650 births
1680 deaths
German Baroque composers
Calvinist and Reformed hymnwriters
German classical composers
German male classical composers
German Protestant hymnwriters
German male writers
17th-century classical composers
German-language poets
People from Düsseldorf
17th-century male musicians